Athanasius I may refer to:

Athanasius of Alexandria (c. 293 – 373), also called Pope Athanasius I of Alexandria, Christian theologian
Athanasius I Gammolo (died 631), Syriac Patriarch of Antioch
Athanasius I (bishop of Naples) (830–872)
Athanasius I of Constantinople (1230–1310),  Ecumenical Patriarch of Constantinople